Ann Mulvale (born 1949) is a Canadian politician. She served as mayor of Oakville, Ontario for 18 years, from 1988 to 2006.

Mayor of Oakville
Mulvale was first elected mayor in 1988, defeating incumbent Bill Perras, after unsuccessfully running against him in 1985. Mulvale was acclaimed mayor in 1991 and re-elected three more times - in 1994, 1997 and 2003. In 2006 she was defeated by Rob Burton. Mulvale was a candidate for mayor in the 2010 Oakville municipal election. She lost to Rob Burton by 4838 votes.

While Oakville's Mayor, Mulvale served on the Mayors' and Regional Chairs' Committee for the Greater Toronto Area and the Greater Toronto Services Board as well as on the Large Urban Mayors' Caucus of Ontario. In February 2002 she was appointed by the Minister of Municipal Affairs, Chris Hodgson to the Central Ontario Smart Growth Panel and its Gridlock Sub-Panel. In November 2002 Mulvale was asked to sit, as the only actively serving politician in the GTA, on the Steering Committee of the Toronto City Summit Alliance.

AMO President
Mulvale has been involved with the Association of Municipalities of Ontario since 1990, serving as its president from 2000 to 2004 while concurrently Mayor of Oakville. She was first elected president in 2000. In her first term she helped secure the passage of the new Municipal Act of Ontario. In 2003 she was reinstated as president, serving until 2004.

Other political activity
 Regional and Town Councillor, Oakville, 1980 to 1985, representing Ward 5.
 Candidate for Mayor of the Town of Oakville in the 1985 Municipal Election (not elected) 
 Oakville—Milton Progressive Conservative Candidate in the 1993 Canadian Federal Election (not elected).
 Candidate for Ward 5 Regional Councillor, 2014 Municipal Election (not elected) 
 Candidate for Ward 5 Regional Councillor, 2018 Municipal Election (not elected)

Not-for profit work
Mulvale served as executive director of the United Way of Oakville from 1986 to 1989.

Volunteer work
Mulvale has served on the board of directors of:
 United Way of Oakville, campaign chair in 2008 and 2009.
 Wellspring, a centre providing cancer support services.
 Waterfront Regeneration Trust, a charitable corporation protecting Lake Ontario shoreline.
 Oakville Community Foundation, a community development organization.

Personal life
Ann Mulvale was born in England in 1949. She emigrated to Canada in 1969, settling in Oakville in 1972. She was married to Peter Mulvale (deceased 1995) with whom she had two children, David and Robert.

See also
List of mayors of Oakville, Ontario

References

Mayors of Oakville, Ontario
Living people
Women mayors of places in Ontario
1949 births
Progressive Conservative Party of Canada candidates for the Canadian House of Commons
Candidates in the 1993 Canadian federal election
20th-century Canadian women politicians